Charles B. Lawrence (c. 1790, Bordentown, New Jersey - 1864, Philadelphia (?)) (Charles Bird Lawrence) was an American painter; primarily of portraits and landscapes. He also produced copies of popular paintings by other artists.

Biography
He is said to have studied with Gilbert Stuart and Rembrandt Peale. His first known paintings were of Bordentown. One was published as an engraving in an issue of The Port Folio in 1816.

Between 1813 and 1837, he worked in Philadelphia and exhibited at the Pennsylvania Academy of Fine Arts. He appears to have given up painting after that time.

References

External links

1790s births
1864 deaths
American painters
American landscape painters
American portrait painters